Săldăbagiu may refer to several places in Romania:

 Săldăbagiu de Barcău, a village in Balc Commune, Bihor County
 Săldăbagiu de Munte, a village in Paleu Commune, Bihor County
 Săldăbagiu Mic, a village in Căpâlna Commune, Bihor County
 Săldăbagiu, a tributary of the Barcău in Bihor County